This is a list showing the 100 most populous cities in Pakistan as of the 2017 Census of Pakistan. City populations found in this list only refer to the population found within the city's defined limits and any adjacent cantonment, if exists (except for Gujranwala and Okara). The census totals below come from the Pakistan Bureau of Statistics for the four provinces of Pakistan and the Islamabad Capital Territory, and from the Azad Jammu and Kashmir Planning & Development Department (PND AJK) for cities inside Azad Kashmir.

As of the 2017 Census, there are two megacities, ten million-plus cities, and 100 cities having a population of 100,000 or more. Of these 100 cities, 58 are located in the country's most populous province, Punjab, 22 in Sindh, 11 in Khyber Pakhtunkhwa, six in Balochistan, two in Azad Kashmir, and one in Islamabad Capital Territory. It is unknown whether Gilgit-Baltistan has any city with over 100,000 people or not, as Gilgit-Baltistan has not yet publicly released any 2017 census results. As in the previous census in 1998, the largest city of Gilgit-Baltistan was Gilgit, with 56,701 inhabitants.

List

Divisional capital

See also
List of metropolitan areas in Pakistan
Demography of Pakistan
 List of cities in Balochistan, Pakistan by population
 List of cities in Gilgit-Baltistan by population
 List of cities in Khyber Pakhtunkhwa by population
 List of cities in Sindh by population
 List of cities in Punjab, Pakistan by population

References

Demographics of Pakistan
Cities in Pakistan
Pakistan